Adapur Assembly constituency was an assembly constituency in Purvi Champaran district in the Indian state of Bihar.

Overview
It was part of Bettiah Lok Sabha constituency.

As a consequence of the orders of the Delimitation Commission of India, Adapur Assembly constituency ceased to exist in 2010.

Election results
In the October 2005 and February 2005 state assembly elections, Shyam Bihari Prasad of JD(U) won the Adapur assembly seat defeating his nearest rival Sabir Ali of LJP in October 2005, and Rambabu Prasad Yadav of RJD in February 2005. Contests in most years were multi cornered but only winners and runners are being mentioned. Virendra Prasad, Independent, defeated Shyam Behari Prasad of RJD in 2000. Brij Bihari Prasad of JD defeated Virendra Prasad, Independent, in 1995 and Mukti Narayan Ray of CPI(M-L) in 1990. Hari Shankar Yadav of Congress defeated Braj Bihari Prasad, Independent, in 1985. Sharminuddin Hasmi of Janata Party (Secular – Charan Singh) defeated Sajawal Ray of Congress in 1980. Ram Prit Rai of Congress defeated Sharminuddin Hasmi of Janata Party in 1977.

References

Former assembly constituencies of Bihar
Politics of East Champaran district